Live at Long Beach City College (reissued in 1998 as Blues Dues (Live at Long Beach City College)) is an album by jazz guitarist Joe Pass, recorded in 1984.

Reception

Writing for Allmusic, music critic Scott Yanow wrote of the album "For this live date, Pass explores seven standards and a couple of original blues, but manages to find fresh variations to play during such songs as "Wave," "All the Things You Are," and an exploratory rendition of "Honeysuckle Rose.""

Track listing
 "Wave" (Antônio Carlos Jobim) – 5:52
 "Blues in "G"" (Joe Pass) – 7:05
 "All the Things You Are" (Oscar Hammerstein II, Jerome Kern) – 5:43
 "'Round Midnight" (Thelonious Monk, Cootie Williams) – 6:26
 "Here's That Rainy Day" (Johnny Burke, Jimmy Van Heusen) – 4:48
 "Duke Ellington's Sophisticated Lady Melange" (Duke Ellington) – 6:37
 "Blues Dues" (Pass) – 5:31
 "Bluesette" (Norman Gimbel, Toots Thielemans) – 3:43
 "Honeysuckle Rose" (Fats Waller, Andy Razaf) – 5:50

Personnel
Joe Pass – guitar

References

Albums produced by Norman Granz
Joe Pass live albums
1984 live albums
Pablo Records live albums